USCGC Steadfast (WMEC-623) is a United States Coast Guard medium endurance cutter and has served the United States for over 50 years. Commissioned in 1968, Steadfast was home ported in St. Petersburg, Florida for her first 24 years of service. In 1992, she was decommissioned for Major Maintenance Availability (MMA) to extend her service another 25 years. Following MMA in February 1994, Steadfast was re-commissioned and home ported in Astoria, Oregon.

Since commissioning in 1968, Steadfast has completed over 330 Search and Rescue cases, interdicted over 1.6 million pounds of marijuana and 27,700 pounds of cocaine, seized over 65 vessels, and stopped over 3500 undocumented migrants on the high seas from entering the United States. Steadfast was the first, and is one of only two cutters awarded the gold marijuana leaf, symbolizing one million pounds of marijuana seized. Legend holds Steadfast was named "El Tiburón Blanco" (Spanish for "The White Shark") by Colombian drug smugglers in the 1970s for being such a nemesis to their illegal drug operations. Steadfasts crew uses the symbol of "El Tiburón Blanco" as one of their logos to epitomize Steadfasts aggressive law enforcement posture.

On 21 September 1978, Douglas DC-3 N407D of Argosy Airlines crashed into the Caribbean Sea whilst on a ferry flight from Fort Lauderdale International Airport to José Martí International Airport, Havana. All four people on board were killed. The aircraft disappeared off radar screens at 12:43 local time (17:43 UTC). A search was initiated, which Steadfast coordinated, but was called off on 24 September without any trace of N407D being found.

References

External links
Steadfast home page

Ships of the United States Coast Guard
Reliance-class cutters
1966 ships
Ships built in Lorain, Ohio